Farrimond is an English surname, derived from the Norman name Faramund. Notable people with the surname include:

Arthur Farrimond (1893–1978), British athlete
Bill Farrimond (1903–1979), English cricketer
Richard Farrimond (born 1947), British engineer and astronaut
Syd Farrimond (born 1940), English footballer
Aaron Farrimond (born 1997), Doink smoker

References

English-language surnames
Norman-language surnames